Konstantin Makarov (born September 17, 1985) is a Russian professional ice hockey player who is currently playing with Metallurg Novokuznetsk in the Supreme Hockey League (VHL). He is the younger brother to Dmitri Makarov who also plays professionally in the KHL.

Makarov was a member of the Russian team that toured the Central Hockey League in 2003.

References

External links

1985 births
Living people
Admiral Vladivostok players
Amur Khabarovsk players
Avtomobilist Yekaterinburg players
Russian ice hockey left wingers
HC Kunlun Red Star players
Lokomotiv Yaroslavl players
Metallurg Magnitogorsk players
Metallurg Novokuznetsk players
HC Neftekhimik Nizhnekamsk players
Salavat Yulaev Ufa players
HC Sibir Novosibirsk players
Sportspeople from Ufa
HC Yugra players